Supergroup or super group may refer to:

 Supergroup (music), a music group formed by artists who are already notable or respected in their fields
 Supergroup (physics), a generalization of groups, used in the study of supersymmetry
 Supergroup (City of Heroes), the term for player guilds in the City of Heroes MMORPG 
 Superdry, a British clothing company, formerly traded as SuperGroup plc
 Supergroup (TV series), a VH1 reality show
 Super Group, an album by Shonen Knife
 Supergroup (stratigraphy), a geological unit
 Supergroup (biology), one of a number of taxonomic groups proposed for Eukaryotes 
 Super-group, a team of superheroes who work together
 Supergroup, a rarely used term in mathematics for the counterpart of a subgroup
 In L-carrier, a multiplexed group of Channel Groups
 Super Group the holding company for online sports betting and gaming businesses: Betway and Spin